Carabus pyrenaeus is a species of ground beetle in the Iniopachus subgenus, that can be found in Andorra, France, and Spain.

References

pyrenaeus
Beetles described in 1821
Beetles of Europe